Levani Sosoyevich Latsuzbaya (born 23 March 1988) is a Russian former professional football player.

Club career
He made his Russian Football National League debut for FC Shinnik Yaroslavl on 24 June 2009 in a game against FC Baltika Kaliningrad.

External links
 
 

1988 births
Footballers from Yaroslavl
Living people
Russian footballers
Association football midfielders
FC Shinnik Yaroslavl players
FC Olimpia Volgograd players
FC Spartak Kostroma players
FC Petrotrest players
FC Dynamo Bryansk players
FC Volga Ulyanovsk players